Three Tickets to Hollywood is a 1993 Serbian comedy film directed by Božidar Nikolić.

Cast 
 Branislav Lečić - Gavrilo
 Bogdan Diklić - Zivadin
 Ljubiša Samardžić - Limijer
 Neda Arnerić - Natalija
 Bata Živojinović - Mrgud
 Branislav Jerinić - Spasoje 
  - Ruza
 Dragan Nikolić - Aldo
  - Nikola
 Vesna Čipčić - Uciteljica
 Mima Karadžić - Globus 
 Danilo Lazović - Brica
 Petar Banićević - Timosenko
 Dušan Janićijević - Postar

References

External links 

1993 comedy films
1993 films
Serbian comedy films
Films set in Serbia
Films set in Yugoslavia
Yugoslav comedy films
1990s Serbian-language films